HR is a radio comedy-drama written by Nigel Williams and produced by Peter Kavanagh. The show ran for five series between 2009 and 2014 and starred Nicholas Le Prevost and Jonathan Pryce. A total of thirty episodes were made for the series.

The show follows lazy human resources officer Sam and trouble-making colleague Peter. From the second series, the pair have retired.

A pilot episode for television was also made and broadcast on BBC Four in 2007.

Cast
 Nicholas Le Provost as Sam
 Jonathan Pryce as Peter
 Kate Fahy as Kate (Series 5)
 David Haig as Ed (Series 5)

Episodes

Series 1

Series 2

Series 3

Series 4

Series 5

References

External links

BBC Radio comedy programmes
2009 radio programme debuts